The USS Liberty was a schooner built at Skenesboro, New York, on Lake Champlain, for wealthy landowner and former British Army Captain Philip Skene. It was captured on 11 May 1775 during a raid on Skenesboro led by Capt. Samuel Herrick, an early action in the American Revolution.

Service history

Originally named Katherine, she was renamed Liberty to honor the patriot cause. 

She sailed to Fort Ticonderoga on 13 May 1775 and filled out her crew. Later that day she got underway for Fort Crown Point where she arrived at sunset the following day. On 16 May she pushed on toward St. Jean, the British shipyard on the lake. North of Isle La Motte, the schooner was becalmed, but General Benedict Arnold with a party of 35 men pressed on in small boats. After rowing all night the raiders surprised the fort and captured the sloop George, mounting six 6-pounders.

Liberty and the prize, renamed , gave the Americans undisputed control of the entire lake. The two ships, reinforced by new vessels built at Skenesboro, supported the Continental forces during the Canadian campaign, and prepared to defend the lake when the British assumed the offensive. During the Battle of Valcour Island, Liberty, away on a supply run, escaped the fate of most of Arnold's fleet, only to be destroyed the following summer as Burgoyne marched south.

References

Bibliography

Further reading

External links 

Schooners of the United States Navy
Ships of the Continental Navy
Ships built in Whitehall, New York
1775 ships
Lake Champlain